Aethes interruptofasciata is a species of moth of the family Tortricidae. It is found in North America, where it has been recorded from Manitoba, Nova Scotia, Illinois, Maine, Michigan, Missouri, New Jersey, Pennsylvania, West Virginia and Wisconsin. The habitat consists of deciduous forest openings and blueberry thickets.

The ground colour of the forewings is cream, suffused with cinnamon and fuscous scales. The markings vary from cinnamon to burnt umber. The hindwings are dark drab. Adults have been recorded on wing from May to August, probably in multiple generations per year.

References

interruptofasciata
Moths described in 1869
Moths of North America